V. Ramakrishna Polytechnic is an institution for technical education in North Chennai, India. It is situated in Thiruvottiyur, a place having historic importance in the Hindu religion.

External links 
kcg college of tech

Universities and colleges in Chennai